Nell Massey (born 21 February 1938) is an Australian former international cricketer. Massey played three Test matches for the Australia national women's cricket team.

References

1938 births
Australia women Test cricketers
Living people
Cricketers from Western Australia
People from Mount Barker, Western Australia
Sportswomen from Western Australia